Crawl ratio is a term used in the automotive world to describe the highest gear ratio that a vehicle is capable of. Note that gear ratio, also known as speed ratio, of a gear train is defined as the ratio of the angular velocity of the input gear to the angular velocity of the output gear, and thus a higher gear ratio implies a larger speed reduction, i.e. the input speed is reduced more at the output. The highest gear ratio is obtained at either first gear or reverse gear, but only first gear is typically taken into consideration while talking about crawl ratio. A potentially confusing terminology is that although a better crawl ratio is achieved by a higher gear ratio, it is common to refer to a better crawl ratio as “lower crawl ratio” rather than “higher crawl ratio” because it’s for driving at lower speeds.

The crawl ratio is aptly named because when a vehicle is driven using the lowest gear (i.e. first gear), it moves the slowest (i.e. crawl speed) at a given engine rpm, and thus produces the highest output torque (i.e. crawl torque) at the road wheels due to conservation of power.

Since crawl ratio of a vehicle represents the total reduction of the engine speed until the road wheels, it is determined by combining the contributions of different elements on the entire drive train, including transmission and differential, both of which typically introduce a certain amount of speed reduction.

Since a lower crawl ratio (higher gear ratio) implies a larger output torque on the road wheels, it is desirable for vehicles that need to pull large loads, climb steep inclines, or drive over obstacles on the road or terrain, such as rocks, which is sometimes referred to as crawling over the rocks. Therefore, crawl ratios are most often discussed for large SUVs, trucks and off-road vehicles.

Note that tire size (or dimensions of the road wheels) does not affect the gear ratio of a vehicle, and thus using a different size tire on the same vehicle does not affect the torque on the road wheels or the crawl ratio. However, for a given engine speed and a gear ratio, the output force on the road wheels decreases as the tire size increases. A lower force in turn decreases the acceleration of rotating wheels. Therefore, the smallest tires that are still big enough to drive over obstacles perform better for a given crawl ratio.

Crawl ratio can vary greatly among vehicles. Crawl ratios in the 60's (i.e. a gear ratio of 60:1) are quite capable; in the 80's, very respectable; in the 110's, impressive; and anything beyond the 130's is usually considered as the point of diminishing returns.

Engineering ratios
Mechanical power transmission